G. John Joseph is an Indian politician and a current Member of the Legislative Assembly. He was elected to the Tamil Nadu legislative assembly as a Communist Party of India (Marxist) candidate from Vilavancode constituency in Kanyakumari district in 2006 election.

References 

People from Kanyakumari district
Communist Party of India (Marxist) politicians from Tamil Nadu
Living people
Year of birth missing (living people)